William Fitzhugh Gordon (January 13, 1787 – July 21, 1858) was a nineteenth-century, lawyer, military officer, politician and planter from the piedmont region of Virginia.

Early life and education
William Fitzhugh Gordon was born at "Germanna", a plantation near Fredericksburg, Virginia to Elizabeth Gordon and her husband (and cousin) James Gordon, Jr. (1759-1799). His grandfather John Gordon had emigrated to the Virginia colony in 1738 from County Down in northern Ireland, as did his elder brother James Gordon (1711-1768), and they both became successful tobacco merchants and planters in Virginia's Tidewater region. John Gordon had initially joined his brother's business in Lancaster County, but moved across the Rappahannock River to Urbanna in Middlesex County and married Lucy Churchill, who bore a dozen children, including this man's father, who served in the Virginia House of Delegates alongside his cousin and father-in-law James Gordon Sr. (son of the immigrant James Gordon, and who inherited Verville plantation in Lancaster County). Although the immigrant John Gordon ultimately settled in Richmond County, James Gordon Jr. moved westward to near Germanna in what became Spotsylvania County and then Orange County, where he established a plantation near an iron furnace established at the beginning of the century by former Virginia Governor Alexander Spotswood. In 1787, James Gordon owned 21 enslaved adults and 34 enslaved Blacks younger than 16, along with 17 horses, a stud horse, 51 cattle and a 4-wheeled chaise carriage in Orange County. His maternal grandmother was a cousin of Benjamin Harrison, signer of the Declaration of Independence and governor of Virginia. Thus linked to the First Families of Virginia, William Gordon attended private schools appropriate to his class, including Spring Hill Academy. After completing those studies, he read law.

Career
Admitted to the bar in 1808, Gordon began his legal career at Orange Court House. He moved to Charlottesville in Albemarle County in 1809. There he continued his practice and in 1812 won election as the city's commonwealth attorney.

Military officer
Gordon served in the War of 1812, then continued to serve in the Virginia Militia, in 1829 accepting a commission as brigadier general from then-governor William B. Giles, and becoming major general of the Second Brigade in 1840.

Politician
Following the war, Albemarle County voters elected Gordon as one of their representatives in the Virginia House of Delegates, and re-elected him annually to that part-time position basically for a decade except for the 1821-1822 session. Thus, Gordon served from 1818 to 1821 alongside first Samuel Carr, then Thomas Mann Randolph until legislators elected him governor, then Charles Everett, and during those sessions helped established the University of Virginia in his district. After the hiatus in which Everett and Charles Cocke represented Albemarle County, Gordon again won re-election several times until 1829, serving first alongside William C. Rives as well as again with Thomas Mann Randolph, then Rice W. Wood, Charles Cocke and Hugh Nelson. In 1829, Gordon won election to the Virginia Senate, where he represented Albemarle County, as well as nearby Amherst, Nelson, Fluvanna and Goochland Counties. Gordon also represented Albemarle, Amherst, Nelson, Fluvanna and Goochland counties in the Virginia Constitutional Convention of 1829-1830 alongside James Pleasants, Lucas P. Thompson and Thomas Massie Jr. He proposed the "mixed basis" compromise ultimately adopted when western representatives complained about the overrepresentation of Tidewater planters in the Virginia General Assembly.

In 1830, Gordon resigned from the Virginia Senate to succeed William Cabell Rives in the United States House of Representatives, and won re-election as a Jacksonian, serving until 1835. He earned the nickname "Sub-Treasury Gordon" for helping to devise the Sub-Treasury Act in 1844, an act that separated the federal government from banks.

Gordon attended the Southern Convention in Nashville, Tennessee in 1850 as a delegate. He served as a Democrat.

Planter 
After failing to win reelection in 1835, Gordon returned to farming and his legal practice. Gordon lived in a planter economy largely dependent upon slavery, and as a landholder, his plantation operated with enslaved labor. He owned 29 slaves in Albemarle County in 1820, 44 slaves in the 1830 federal census. In both the 1840 federal census. and the 1850 federal census, Gordon owned 54 slaves.

Personal life
Gordon married twice. His first wife, Mary Robinson Rootes, daughter of Thomas Reade Rootes of Fredericksburg died without bearing any children who survived. He remarried, to Elizabeth Lindsay, daughter of Col. Reuben Linday of Albemarle County, who had fought in the Continental Army during the American Revolutionary War, then refused both refused repayment of this $1,000 loan to assist the cause, as well as never claimed the land bounty awarded him for his service. They had eight sons (six of whom became soldiers in the Confederate Army) and three daughters who reached maturity. 

 James Lindsay Gordon (1813-1877) became an attorney and served many years as the Commonwealth attorney for Louisa County
 Twin brothers George Loyall Gordon (1829-1862) and Charles Henry Gordon (1829-1897) also became Confederate officers, with George Loyall Gordon dying at the Battle of Malvern Hill
 Reuben Lindsay Gordon (1820–1887) also became a lawyer and planter
 Dr. John Churchill Gordon (1831–1919)
 Dr. Alexander Tazewell Gordon (1833–1903)
 Sgt. Mason Gordon (1840–1914) likewise survived the conflict
 Maria Lindsay Gordon (1815-1848), never married but took care of family members before dying of typhoid fever
 Hannah Elizabeth Gordon Robertson (1817-1861) married William Robertson and bore nine children before her death.

Death and legacy
Gordon died at his Edgeworth plantation in Albemarle County, Virginia on July 21, 1858. He was interred at the family cemetery in Springfield, Virginia. His eldest son James Lindsay Gordon (1813-1877) became a lawyer and served two terms in the Virginia House of Delegates, but did not have any children. His brother George Loyall Gordon (1829-1862) followed a similar career path as a lawyer in Alexandria and Charlottesville but became a newspaper editor instead of a politician and married the eldest daughter of North Carolina judge Joseph J. Daniel. As the Civil War started, he joined the 15th North Carolina regiment (Edgecombe Guards) and died at the Battle of Malvern Hill. His son Armistead C. Gordon (W.F. Gordon's grandson), born at his grandfather's Edgeworth plantation and raised at Longwood plantation in North Carolina, became a lawyer and writer as well as mayor of Staunton, Virginia, and his brother James L. Gordon (1858-1904) also became lawyer, then followed his grandfather's and uncle's path into the Virginia state senate before moving to New York where he became an assistant district attorney and noted for his oratory.

References

External links

1787 births
1858 deaths
Politicians from Fredericksburg, Virginia
People from Charlottesville, Virginia
Members of the Virginia House of Delegates
Virginia lawyers
American militiamen in the War of 1812
Fitzhugh family of Virginia
American planters
Jacksonian members of the United States House of Representatives from Virginia
19th-century American lawyers
19th-century American politicians
American militia generals
American slave owners